The Wheatland–Chili Central School District in Scottsville, NY serves approximately 700 students in the village of Scottsville and portions of the towns of Chili, Wheatland, and Brighton in Monroe County and a portion of the town of Caledonia in Livingston County, with over 160 employees. It is the smallest school district in Monroe County.

Founded in 1955, the District celebrated 50 Years of Learning in 2005.

The average class size is 17-19 students, the average grade size is approximately 60 students and the student-teacher ratio is 13:1(elementary), 13:1(middle-high school).

The District motto is "Personalized Education...Powerful Results".

Lynda Quick is the Superintendent of Schools.

Board of education
The Board of Education (BOE) consists of 7 members who serve rotating 3-year terms. Elections are held each May for board members and to vote on the School District Budget.

Schools

Elementary school

TJ Connor Elementary School (K-5)
Daniel Murray, Ed.D Principal
13 Beckwith Ave.
Scottsville, NY 14546

Middle school

Wheatland-Chili Middle School (6-8)
Eric Windover, Principal
940 North Rd, Scottsville, NY 14546

High school
Wheatland-Chili High School (9-12)
Eric Windover, Principal 
940 North Rd., Scottsville, NY 14546

The school mascot was the Scotsmen until the 1990s, after which a new mascot was chosen. They have since been called the Wheatland-Chili Wildcats.

Alumni

Theodore McKee A Senior Circuit Court Judge, Class of 1965

References

External links
 
 New York State School Boards Association

School districts in New York (state)
Education in Livingston County, New York
Education in Monroe County, New York
School districts established in 1955